József Szendrei (born 25 April 1954 in Karcag, Hungary) is a retired Hungarian football goalkeeper.

He is most famous for playing for the Hungarian national team at the 1986 FIFA World Cup in Mexico, where Hungary failed to progress from the group stage. Szendrei was a player of Újpesti Dózsa, CD Málaga and Cádiz CF.

References

1954 births
Living people
Hungarian footballers
Hungarian expatriate footballers
1986 FIFA World Cup players
Hungary international footballers
Újpest FC players
CD Málaga footballers
Cádiz CF players
Segunda División players
La Liga players
Expatriate footballers in Spain
Hungarian expatriate sportspeople in Spain
Association football goalkeepers